Katherine Jane Prince  (born 1974) is a British choreographer, and the founder and director of ZooNation.

Early life
Kate Prince was born in Southampton in 1974. She grew up in a middle class family in Hampshire, attending a private school. She enjoyed watching MTV videos and musicals as a child, which inspired her desire to dance. (Ref: BBC 1, Imagine, 2020)

Career
In 2002, Prince founded the London-based dance company ZooNation, for whom she has created the works Into the Hoods and Some Like It Hip Hop. She is an associate artist at Sadler's Wells, London. Prince has been nominated twice for the Laurence Olivier Award for Best Theatre Choreographer - in 2009 for Into the Hoods and in 2018 for Everybody's Talking About Jamie

Prince was appointed Member of the Order of the British Empire (MBE) in the 2019 Birthday Honours for services to dance.

Original works (partial)
 Into the Hoods
 Some Like It Hip Hop
 Groove on Down the Road
 Mad Hatter's Tea Party
 Sylvia

Music videos (partial)
 Utah Saints, "Something Good 08"
 The Saturdays, "Up"

References

1974 births
Living people
English choreographers
People from Southampton
Members of the Order of the British Empire
British choreographers